All Systems Go may refer to:

 All Systems Go!, a Canadian punk rock band, or their debut album
 ASG, an American rock band, initially called All System Go
 All Systems – Go!, a 1965 album by The Honeycombs
 All Systems Go (Donna Summer album), 1987
 "All Systems Go" (song)
 All Systems Go (Rocket from the Crypt album), a compilation album, followed by two further volumes
 All Systems Go (Vinnie Vincent Invasion album), 1988
 "All Systems Go", a song from Box Car Racer (album), 2002

See also 
 All Systems Are Go, a 1984 album by The Archers